Maxwell George Hellmrich (30 August 1932 – 12 August 2013) was an Australian rules footballer who played with Swan Districts in the West Australian Football League (WAFL) and St Kilda in the Victorian Football League (VFL).

Notes

External links 
Max Hellmrich's playing statistics from WAFL Footy Facts

1932 births
2013 deaths
Australian rules footballers from Western Australia
St Kilda Football Club players
Swan Districts Football Club players